Rina Arseneault  is a Canadian social worker, researcher, activist, and educator. She is the associate director at the University of New Brunswick’s Murial McQueen Fergusson Centre for Family Violence Research. In 2013, Arseneault was appointed a Member of the Order of Canada.

Early life and education
Arseneault was born in New Brunswick, Canada, as one of 14 children. She was often treated differently than her brothers and faced gender discrimination from her father, who wanted her to end her education after grade 10. Arseneault was forced to leave home and she negotiated with an elderly neighbour who allowed her to live with her if she took care of the housework. Arseneault earned her Bachelor of Arts and Master's degree in psychology from the Université de Moncton, while also working as an psychiatric attendant at a provincial hospital in Campbellton and a women's shelter.

Career
In 1993, Arseneault joined the Muriel McQueen Fergusson Centre in their inaugural opening year after convincing from the president of the New Brunswick Coalition of Transition House. While there, she was the recipient of the 1997 NB Advisory Council on the Status of Women Recognition Award for her contribution to improving the status of women in New Brunswick. A few years later, she was awarded the 2002 Muriel
McQueen Fergusson Foundation Award for "outstanding contributions toward preventing and eliminating family violence in Canada."

In 2013, Arseneault was appointed a Member of the Order of Canada. Three years later, she received the Canadian Association of Social Workers Distinguished Service Award. While working for the Murial McQueen Fergusson Centre for Family Violence Research, Arseneault helped conduct a study which showed that women in rural New Brunswick had difficulty escaping violence than those in urban areas. Two years later, she was selected to attend United Nations Commission on the Status of Women. In December 2018, Arseneault was the recipient of the Governor General's Awards in Commemoration of the Persons Case.

Personal life
Arseneault and her husband Dan have three sons together.

References

Living people
Université de Moncton alumni
Members of the Order of Canada
Canadian social work academics
Academic staff of the University of New Brunswick
Activists from New Brunswick
Canadian women academics
Year of birth missing (living people)
Women in New Brunswick
Governor General's Award in Commemoration of the Persons Case winners